Floriston railway station was a station which served the rural area around Floristonrigg, Rockcliffe Parish, south of Gretna in the English county of Cumberland (now part of Cumbria). It was served by local trains on what is now known as the West Coast Main Line. The nearest station for Floriston is now at Carlisle.

History 
Opened by the Caledonian Railway, it became part of the London Midland and Scottish Railway during the Grouping of 1923 and was then closed by British Railways in 1950.

The station had a few sidings, a signal box on the other side of the level crossing from the platforms, pedestrian overbridge, stationmaster's house, ticket office and a waiting room. The line was double track here, however it is now a triple track section built on the site of one of the platforms, a siding, etc. Floriston was in the vicinity of the bridge over the River Esk.

The site today 
Trains pass at speed on the electrified West Coast Main Line. The station platforms and all other buildings have been demolished, the pedestrian overbridge has also been removed, however the level crossing is still present.

References

Notes

Sources

External links
 Rail Brit
 Floriston Level Crossing
 Cumbrian Railways Association

Disused railway stations in Cumbria
Railway stations in Great Britain opened in 1847
Railway stations in Great Britain closed in 1950
Former Caledonian Railway stations
1847 establishments in England
Rockcliffe, Cumbria